"The Trumpeter" is a 1904 song with music by J. Airlie Dix (d.1911) and lyrics by J. Francis Barron  (1870-1940) which became a widely popular before, during and after World War I. Also known by the song's opening line and refrain "Trumpeter, what are you sounding now?", it was recorded with full orchestral arrangement by various artists including Peter Dawson and John McCormack.

References

Songs about musicians
Songs about trumpets
1904 songs